The 2007 Supercopa de España was two-leg Spanish football matches played on 11 August and 19 August 2007. It contested by Sevilla, who were Copa del Rey winners in 2006–07, and Real Madrid, who won the 2006–07 La Liga. Sevilla won 6–3 on aggregate.

Match details

First leg

Second leg

References

Supercopa de Espana Final
Supercopa de Espana 2007
Supercopa de Espana 2007
Supercopa de España